Yehor Yehorov (born August 17, 1999) is a Ukrainian-born ice dancer. Competing for the United States with his skating partner, Molly Cesanek, he is the 2021 Lake Placid Ice Dance International bronze medalist and has competed on the Grand Prix series.

Personal life
Yehorov was born August 17, 1999, in Brovary, Ukraine. He moved to the United States in 2018.

Career

Early years 
Yehorov became interested in skating after noticing an ice rink near his school when he was in first grade and switched from singles to ice dancing when he was 14.

Early in his career, he competed with Anhelina Sinkevych for Ukraine. Coached by Maria Tumanovska and Yevhen Kholoniuk in Kyiv, the duo made their ISU Junior Grand Prix (JGP) debut in September 2014, placing 11th in Japan. The following season, Sinkevych/Yehorov finished 9th at their JGP assignment in Colorado Springs, Colorado. They were coached by Evgeni Platov in New Jersey. After their partnership ended, he skated with Russia's Alexandra Pletneva, but the two made no competitive appearances together.

In 2017, Yehorov represented Ukraine with Olha Hihlava (also transliterated Olga Giglava). The duo competed at two JGP events, placing 7th in Austria and 11th in Croatia, and won medals at the Halloween Cup in Hungary and Bosphorus Cup in Turkey. They were coached by Natalia Vorobieva in Kyiv.

Partnership with Cesanek 
Yehorov teamed up with American ice dancer Molly Cesanek in April 2018. During the first two seasons of their partnership, they trained at the Rockville Ice Arena in Maryland. In their first season, they placed 5th in the junior event at the 2019 U.S. Championships. Ukraine then released him to compete internationally for the United States.

Continuing in juniors the following season, Cesanek/Yehorov took bronze at the Lake Placid Ice Dance International and received two ISU Junior Grand Prix assignments, finishing 6th at both. They were awarded the pewter medal for fourth place at the 2020 U.S. Championships and won gold at the Egna Dance Trophy in February. 

Ahead of the 2020–21 season, their first in the senior ranks, Cesanek/Yehorov switched to the Ion International Training Center in Leesburg, Virginia but kept the same coaching team. The duo resumed on-ice training in June after three months away due to COVID-related closures. In October, they finished 5th at the 2020 Skate America, a Grand Prix event which, due to COVID, was limited to American and U.S.-based skaters. They were also 5th at the 2021 U.S. Championships.

In August 2021, Cesanek/Yehorov won bronze at the Lake Placid Ice Dance International. After finishing 13th at the 2021 CS Lombardia Trophy and 9th at the 2021 Skate America, they placed 6th at the 2021 CS Golden Spin of Zagreb.

Programs

With Cesanek

With Hihlava

With Sinkevych

Competitive highlights 
GP: Grand Prix; CS: Challenger Series; JGP: Junior Grand Prix

With Cesanek for the United States

With Hihlava for Ukraine

With Sinkevych for Ukraine 

Levels: N = Novice; J = Junior

References

External links 
 

1999 births
Living people
American male ice dancers
People from Brovary
Ukrainian emigrants to the United States
Ukrainian male ice dancers